Lynn Morris Jones (born January 1, 1953) is an American former professional baseball player, coach, and manager. He played as an outfielder in Major League Baseball (MLB) for the Detroit Tigers and Kansas City Royals. He later was a coach for the Royals, Florida Marlins, and Boston Red Sox, and served as a manager in the minor leagues.

Biography
Jones attended Thiel College, in western Pennsylvania, where he played for the Tomcats, setting the school's single-season batting record, hitting .440 in 1974. A three-sport athlete, Jones also played basketball and soccer in college. In 1987, he was inducted into the college's athletic Hall of Fame.  He joined the Theta Phi chapter of Alpha Chi Rho Fraternity while at Thiel.

Playing career
Jones was originally drafted by the Cincinnati Reds in the 10th round of the 1974 June draft before being chosen by the Detroit Tigers in the 1978 Rule 5 draft.

Named Detroit's Rookie of the Year in 1979, Jones also played in 14 career post-season games with the Kansas City Royals (1984–1985), going 2-for-3 with a double and a triple in six games in the 1985 World Series against St. Louis.

Over eight-major league seasons, Jones batted .252 with seven home runs and 91 RBI in 527 games.

Post-playing career
Following his retirement as a player, Jones managed in the minor leagues for the Florida Marlins and Atlanta Braves organizations. In nine seasons as a minor-league manager, Jones compiled a 555–630 (.468) record and reached the postseason twice, in 1995 and 1997 with Kane County of the Midwest League.

Jones was first base coach in the major leagues for the Royals in 1991 and 1992. He also coached (initially first base, then third base) for the Marlins in 2001, when he also instructed the club's outfielders and baserunners. During 2004 and 2005, Jones coached first base for the Boston Red Sox. He missed part of the 2004 season after sustaining a non-baseball eye injury. The 2004 Red Sox won the World Series, Jones' second championship team.

After working as the minor-league baserunning coordinator for the Braves, Jones joined the coaching staff of his alma mater, Thiel College, in 2013.

References

External links
 

   
   
 
   

1953 births
Living people
African-American baseball coaches
African-American baseball players
Baseball coaches from Pennsylvania
Baseball players from Pennsylvania
Boston Red Sox coaches
Detroit Tigers players
Eugene Emeralds players
Evansville Triplets players
Florida Marlins coaches
Indianapolis Indians players
Kansas City Royals coaches
Kansas City Royals players
Lowell Spinners managers
Major League Baseball first base coaches
Major League Baseball center fielders
Major League Baseball third base coaches
Portland Sea Dogs managers
Seattle Rainiers players
Thiel Tomcats baseball players
Thiel Tomcats men's basketball players
Trois-Rivières Aigles players
21st-century African-American people
20th-century African-American sportspeople